Brett William Brown (born February 16, 1961) is an American professional basketball coach who is an assistant coach for the San Antonio Spurs of the National Basketball Association (NBA). Brown is a former college basketball player who previously served as head coach for the Philadelphia 76ers from 2013 to 2020. Before that, Brown was an assistant on Gregg Popovich's staff on the Spurs. He also has extensive experience coaching in Australia, having been the head coach of the North Melbourne Giants and Sydney Kings of the National Basketball League (NBL).

Playing career

High school
Born and raised in Maine, Brown first played organized basketball in Rockland, was a star guard in junior high school there, and then his father was hired as the head coach. Brown transferred to South Portland where he became a star basketball player at South Portland High School, from which he graduated in 1979. Brown was a two-year first-team all-state guard in 1978 and 1979, and led his team to a 27–0 record and a State Class A Title in his senior year. Both Brown and his father, Bob Brown, who was South Portland's head coach during Brown's playing career, are inductees to the New England Basketball Hall of Fame.

Collegiate career
Brown played four seasons at Boston University under Rick Pitino. He was named the Lou Cohen MVP in his sophomore year and served as the team captain in both his junior and senior seasons. During his senior year in 1983, the Boston Terriers made their first appearance in the NCAA Tournament since 1959. By the time he graduated, Brown had compiled the fourth-most assists in school history. After graduation, he served as a graduate assistant under coach John Kuester. Brown also took a sales job with AT&T, saving enough money to take a backpacking trip to Oceania in 1987.

Coaching career

NBL
In 1988, after a coaching stint in New Zealand with Altos Auckland, Brown made a cold call to Melbourne Tigers head coach Lindsay Gaze, ultimately leading to a job offer and Brown making Australia his home for the next 18 years. He served as a Tigers assistant coach until 1993, when he became head coach of the North Melbourne Giants. Brown was named NBL coach of the year in 1994, when he led the Giants to a championship victory over the Adelaide 36ers. He served as head coach of the Giants until 1998, before taking a job with the San Antonio Spurs. Following his stint with the Spurs, Brown coached the Sydney Kings from 2000 to 2002. Overall, he was a head coach for 278 NBL games, winning 54 percent of the time.

San Antonio Spurs

After attending a basketball camp run by Brown and Andrew Gaze, San Antonio Spurs general manager R. C. Buford hired Brown as an unpaid member of the Spurs' basketball operations department for the 1998–99 lockout-shortened season. In 2002, after a stint with the Sydney Kings, he again took a position with the Spurs, this time as the team's director of player development. Buford credited him with focusing attention on the team's lesser-known players, creating a consistently strong bench; this philosophy would continue to benefit the Spurs even after Brown left his role as player development director. He was promoted to assistant coach in September 2007, working under coach Gregg Popovich. Popovich calls Brown "one of his best friends," and Brown would later incorporate many of Popovich's concepts into his own offensive system. He played a major role in signing Australian guard Patty Mills, who played under him for the Australian national team. Brown was a member of the Spurs organization for four of their championship-winning seasons.

Philadelphia 76ers

During the 2013 NBA off-season, Brown was offered a chance to succeed Mike Budenholzer as the top assistant on Gregg Popovich's staff, but in August 2013, he chose instead to become head coach of the Philadelphia 76ers. He inherited a team in "total rebuilding mode" led by new general manager Sam Hinkie, and the Sixers were only able to woo Brown away from the Spurs after offering a 4-year guaranteed contract. His appointment made him the 24th head coach in the history of the franchise, and the second person to be a head coach in both the NBL and the NBA, following Mike Dunlap. The Sixers were the youngest team in the league during Brown's first year, and one of the youngest of all time. During the second half of the 2013–14 season, the Sixers would lose 26 games in a row, tying the record for longest NBA losing streak. Sixers point guard Michael Carter-Williams won the NBA Rookie of the Year Award in 2014, and credited Brown for helping him win the award and grow as a player.

On December 11, 2015, the 76ers signed Brown to a contract extension. On May 31, 2018, the 76ers signed Brown to another contract extension, coming off their first playoff appearance since 2012. On June 7, 2018, Brown was named interim general manager after Bryan Colangelo resigned after a social media scandal, where he and his wife criticized team members. Before the 76ers found his replacement in former player Elton Brand on September 20, 2018, Brown signed off on multiple trades that the 76ers did in the months of June & July, including an infamous trade during the 2018 NBA draft where Philadelphia native and 2x NCAA champion Mikal Bridges from Villanova University was traded to the Phoenix Suns for Zhaire Smith and a 2021 first round pick from the Miami Heat after being selected by the 76ers. He also signed off on the signings of players like Shake Milton, Norvel Pelle, and Anthony Brown at the time, as well as re-signing veterans like JJ Redick, Amir Johnson, and Demetrius Jackson.

On August 24, 2020, Brown was fired by the 76ers after being swept out of the first round of the 2020 NBA playoffs by the Boston Celtics.

Return to San Antonio 
On June 30, 2022, Brown re-joined the San Antonio Spurs as an assistant coach.

National team career 
Brown was an assistant coach of the Australia national team between 1995 and 2003, serving during the 1998 FIBA World Championship and the 1996 and 2000 Summer Olympics. He was hired in 2009 to serve as head coach of the team, and held that position until 2012. Under Brown, Australia finished 10th in the 2010 FIBA World Championship. In the 2012 Summer Olympics, he led Australia to the Quarter-finals, where they were eliminated by the United States national team, who won the tournament.

On November 27, 2019, Brown returned to Australia national team as head coach replacing Andrej Lemanis. He was expected to lead the team at the 2020 Summer Olympics but it was delayed by the COVID-19 pandemic until 2021. Brown quit his role on October 13, 2020, without having led the team in a game. He cited his career uncertainty after his firing from the 76ers and the difficulties of travelling with his family due to the COVID-19 pandemic as the reasons for his departure.

Head coaching record

NBA

|-
| align="left" |Philadelphia
| align="left" |
| 82||19||63||||align="center" |5th in Atlantic||—||—||—||—|| align="center" |Missed playoffs
|-
| align="left" |Philadelphia
| align="left" |
| 82||18||64||||align="center" |4th in Atlantic||—||—||—||—|| align="center" |Missed playoffs
|-
| align="left" |Philadelphia
| align="left" |
| 82||10||72||||align="center" |5th in Atlantic||—||—||—||—|| align="center" |Missed playoffs
|-
| align="left" |Philadelphia
| align="left" |
| 82||28||54||||align="center" |4th in Atlantic||—||—||—||—|| align="center" |Missed playoffs
|-
| align="left" |Philadelphia
| align="left" |
| 82||52||30||||align="center" |3rd in Atlantic||10||5||5|||| align="center" |Lost in Conference Semifinals
|-
| align="left" |Philadelphia
| align="left" |
| 82||51||31||||align="center" |2nd in Atlantic||12||7||5|||| align="center" |Lost in Conference Semifinals
|-
| align="left" |Philadelphia
| align="left" |
| 73||43||30||||align="center" |3rd in Atlantic||4||0||4|||| align="center" |Lost in First Round
|-class="sortbottom"
| align="center" colspan="2"|Total
| 565||221||344|||| ||26||12||14||||

NBL

|-
| align="left" |North Melbourne
| align="left" |1993
| 29||14||15||||align="center" | 8th || 3 || 1 || 2 |||| align="center" | Lost in Quarter Finals
|-
| align="left" |North Melbourne
| align="left" |1994
| 33||25||8||||align="center" | 1st || 7 || 6 || 1 |||| align="center" | Won NBL Finals
|-
| align="left" |North Melbourne
| align="left" |1995
| 34||23||11||||align="center" | 2nd || 8 || 5 || 3 ||||align="center" | Lost in NBL Finals
|-
| align="left" |North Melbourne
| align="left" |1996
| 28||15||13||||align="center" | 7th || 2 || 0 || 2 ||||align="center" | Lost in Quarter Finals
|-
| align="left" |North Melbourne
| align="left" |1997
| 35||20||15||||align="center" | 3rd || 5 || 2 || 3 ||||align="center" | Lost in Semi-Finals 
|-
| align="left" |North Melbourne
| align="left" |1998
| 30||9||21||||align="center" | 11th || — || — || — || — ||align="center" | Missed playoffs
|-
| align="center" colspan="2" |North Melbourne total
|189||106||83|||| || 25 || 14 || 11 ||||align="center"|1 NBL championship
|-
| align="left" |Sydney Kings
| align="left" |2000–01
| 31||18||13||||align="center" | 5th || 3 || 1 || 2 ||||align="center" | Lost in Quarter Finals 
|-
| align="left" |Sydney Kings
| align="left" |2001–02
| 30||14||16||||align="center" | 7th || — || — || — || — ||align="center" | Missed playoffs
|-
| align="center" colspan="2" |Sydney total
| 61||32||29|||| || 3 || 1 || 2 |||| align="center"|—
|-
| align="center" colspan="2" |Total
| 250||138||112|| || ||28||15||13|| || align="center"|1 NBL championships

Personal life
Brown met and married his wife, Anna, in Australia. They have two daughters and a son, Sam. The family resides in Lower Merion, Pennsylvania.

References

1961 births
Living people
American expatriate basketball people in Australia
American men's basketball coaches
American men's basketball players
Basketball coaches from Maine
Basketball players from Maine
Boston University Terriers men's basketball players
National Basketball Association general managers
National Basketball League (Australia) coaches
Sportspeople from South Portland, Maine
Philadelphia 76ers executives
Philadelphia 76ers head coaches
San Antonio Spurs assistant coaches
South Portland High School alumni
Sydney Kings coaches